UPPP may refer to:
 Undecaprenyl-diphosphatase, an enzyme
 Uvulopalatopharyngoplasty, a surgical procedure